Mark Kelo Leslie (born August 20, 1978) is a Belizean footballer who used to play for the Belize national team.

International career
Leslie is member of the Belize national football team.

References

External links
 

1978 births
Living people
Belizean footballers
Belize international footballers
Belizean expatriate footballers
North East Stars F.C. players
Ma Pau Stars S.C. players
Expatriate footballers in Trinidad and Tobago
TT Pro League players
2007 UNCAF Nations Cup players
Association football midfielders
FC Belize players